Oxford University Women’s Association Football Club is an English football club representing the University of Oxford.
The club consists of two squads, the Blues (1st XI) and the Furies (2nd XI). Both teams compete in the BUCS League against other British universities. The Blues won BUCS Midlands Division 2A in the 2013/2014 season, gaining them promotion into Midlands Division 1A. The Blues have retained their place in this league for the 2016/17 season. The Furies won the Midlands 3A league in 2015/16, gaining promotion to the 2A division.

History 
The club was founded in the 1980s and merged with Oxford University A.F.C., the respective men's club, in 1998.

BUCS 
The Blues and Furies compete in BUCS Midlands Division 1A and 2A respectively. The fixtures run from October through March.

Varsity match 

The climax of the season for both teams is the varsity match against Cambridge University. Those women selected to compete in the Blues varsity match receive an Oxford Half-Blue in recognition of their footballing success, with the Full Blue status being achieved if Oxford win the match, or the squad have a "successful" season in BUCS with regards to the Blues status conditions. In 2016, Oxford won the 31st varsity match 1-0.

The first women's varsity match was played in 1986, in which Oxford clinched the victory, beating the Light Blue side 4-3. As of 2016, out of the 29 Blues varsity matches to date, only 2 ended in draws, with the Dark Blues winning just 8 of the games. However, considering just the last 10 years up to 2016, the dark blues have won on 4 accounts.

Blues status 

The women who compete in the Blues varsity match are awarded with an Oxford Blue under the following criteria:

Half Blue: 14 awards maximum to all those who play in the varsity match; subs must have played for at least 5 minutes.

Full Blue: 14 awards maximum. Awarded to women who play in the varsity match AND fulfil any of the following criteria:

Win the varsity match
OR The team reaches the semi final of the Midlands Conference Cup (any player reaching this must have been selected for at least 50% of the cup matches)
OR The team gets promoted that season

Current squads 
As of 7 February 2016, the Blues varsity squad is as follows:

The alumni squad playing the Blues in the hotly anticipated annual Alumni match, was as follows for the 19/20 season:

The match, played on 22 February 2020 at the Oxford City football stadium, ended in a 6-0 win for the alumni squad.

College football 

24 women's college teams are registered to the Women’s College League, of which there are four divisions. Eight of these are joint teams made up of two or three colleges. The college teams also compete in the Cuppers competition, which was won by Worcester College in the season 2013/2014, with a 1-0 victory over Keble/Hertford.

Notable alumni 
Notable alumni include Ananya Birla (singer and entrepreneur), Rachel Riley (TV presenter) and Jen O'Neill (editor of She Kicks women's football magazine).

References

External links 
 

Association football clubs established in 1986
Football
Women's football clubs in England
 
University and college football clubs in England
1986 establishments in England